The 2008 Tipperary Senior Hurling Championship was the 118th staging of the Tipperary Senior Hurling Championship since its establishment by the Tipperary County Board in 1887. The draw for the 2008 fixtures took place in August 2008. The championship began on 13 September 2008 and ended on 19 October 2008.

Loughmore-Castleiney were the defending champions, however, they were defeated by Toomevara in the semi-final.

On 19 October 2008, Toomevara won the championship following a 2-14 to 0-17 defeat of Thurles Sarsfields in the final. This was their 22nd championship title overall and their first since 2006. It remains their last championship victory.

Format

All the teams that reached the divisional semi-finals qualified for the county championship. The eight teams that made the divisional finals were protected by being put in one side of the draw while the defeated semi-finalists were put in the other.

Results

First round

Quarter-finals

Semi-finals

Final

External links

 2008 Tipperary Senior HUrling Championship final programme

References

Tipperary Senior Hurling Championship
Tipperary Senior Hurling Championship